Hotel Giant, known in North America as Maximum Capacity: Hotel Giant, is a business simulation game developed by Enlight Software and published by JoWood Productions for Windows. The soundtrack was composed by Bjørn Lynne.

Gameplay
The play of the game involves developing and managing a hotel. The user starts with a pre-made building to which they add rooms, place useful and decorative objects in the rooms, and set up hotel details such as advertising. Once this has happened, the user opens up the hotel to the public and starts to run it as if it were a real business. It is similar to the "Tycoon" style of game (Railroad Tycoon, RollerCoaster Tycoon, Zoo Tycoon, etc.), in which the player creates a system or establishment and then runs it. Hotel Giant 2 offers improved graphics, more features and a new campaign.

Versions
There are currently three versions of Hotel Giant. These are:
Hotel Giant, released 14 May 2002
Hotel Giant 2, released in UK on 21 November 2008
Hotel Giant DS

Reception

Hotel Giant received a "Gold" sales award from the Entertainment and Leisure Software Publishers Association (ELSPA), indicating sales of at least 200,000 copies in the United Kingdom.

The game received a fairly poor reception, with a Metacritic average of 54%. D+PAD said that any pros were "outweighed by some of the cons, most notably the repetitive and the non-engaging nature of the gameplay." IT Reviews commented that the game "wasn't much fun" and you'd get "more amusement with an old, second hand copy of Sim Tower".

References

External links

2002 video games
Business simulation games
Video games developed in China
Video games scored by Bjørn Lynne
Windows games
Windows-only games
Video games set in hotels
Single-player video games
JoWooD Entertainment games